Turki bin Sultan Al Saud (6 October 1959 – 25 December 2012) was deputy minister of culture and information of Saudi Arabia and a member of House of Saud.

Early life and education
Turki bin Sultan was born on 6 October 1959. He was the son of former Crown Prince Sultan. He was also the full brother of Khalid bin Sultan, Fahd bin Sultan and Faisal bin Sultan. Their mother was Munira bint Abdulaziz bin Musaed Al Jiluwi, who died in Paris in August 2011. Moneera bint Abdulaziz was the sister of Alanoud, the spouse of King Fahd, and also King Khalid and Prince Muhammed's cousin.

After completing his education in media studies in King Saud University in 1981, Turki bin Sultan received a Master of Arts degree from Syracuse University in international communications in 1983 where he was awarded the title of outstanding graduate student.

Later, he joined an American TV network, CBS, as a trainee for one year. He served as CBS's New York representative in 1983.

Career
Turki bin Sultan was appointed director of the press section at the foreign information department of the ministry of culture and information. In 1986, he was promoted as foreign information advisor at the same ministry. Then, he became assistant deputy minister of culture and information for planning and studies affairs in 1990. Beginning in 1996, he served at the ministry of information as assistant deputy minister of information for the foreign information.

In May 2001, Turki bin Sultan was appointed assistant minister of culture and information by King Fahd. His tenure as assistant minister was extended in April 2005 for four years. He was also the supervisor general of Saudi sports channel.

King Abdullah appointed Turki bin Sultan as deputy minister of culture and information for media affairs with the rank of minister on 4 September 2011. Abdullah Al Jasser succeeded Prince Turki in the post following his death.

Other positions
In 1995, Turki bin Sultan was appointed a member of the board of trustees of the Sultan bin Abdulaziz Al Saud Foundation and was a member of the foundation. He was also the acting secretary of the foundation.

In 1999, he presided over the organizing committee for the Kingdom's centennial celebrations. In 1989, Prince Turki led foreign information teams participating in the exhibition 'The Kingdom of Saudi Arabia, Yesterday and Today' organized in France, U.S.A. and Egypt; and was involved in the Kingdom's exhibitions in Los Angeles in 1990 and in Spain in 1992. He attended meetings of the Arab information ministers held in Tunisia and Egypt in 1998.

Personal life
Turki bin Sultan was married and fathered two children, Abdulaziz and Al Anoud. He was the author of a book concerning public relations of Saudi and American armoured forces entitled Military Media. He was an honorary member of Al Hilal club.

Death and funeral
Turki bin Sultan died of a heart attack on 25 December 2012 at Riyadh military hospital. The Royal Court officially announced his death. He was 53. His funeral was performed after Asr prayer led by Abdulaziz Al Asheikh at Imam Turki bin Abdullah Mosque in Riyadh with the attendance of senior princes and officials, including Crown Prince Salman bin Abdulaziz, on 26 December 2012.

References

Turki
Turki
1959 births
2012 deaths
Turki
King Saud University alumni
Turki
Syracuse University alumni